Dowlatabad (also Romanized as Dowlatābād; also known as Bahrāmābād and Dowlatābād-e Harandī) is a village in Eslamiyeh Rural District, in the Central District of Rafsanjan County, Kerman Province, Iran. At the 2006 census, its population was 377, in 83 families.

References 

Populated places in Rafsanjan County